Mikron may refer to:

 Mikron Group, a Russian manufacturer
 Mikron O’Jeneus, a version of comics character Gizmo
 Mikron Theatre Company, an English theatre company that tours by canal boat
 Walter Mikron, a Czech aircraft engine 
Parma Mikron III UL, an engine development for ultralight aircraft

See also

 Micron (disambiguation)